Stephens Media Group is an Oklahoma based radio broadcaster that owns 75 radio stations particularly in small to mid-size markets. Its flagship stations are at its headquarters in Tulsa. Stephens refers to itself as "A portfolio of People", referencing the team members who work for the company.

History
Stephens Media started with stations around Tulsa, Oklahoma, before expanding to small markets outside of there.

On May 1, 2008, Stephens Media announced that it would acquire WFKL, WRMM-FM, and WZNE in Rochester, New York, as a part of Entercom's purchase of stations from CBS Radio in the market.

In April 2018, Ingstad Radio sold 14 of its stations in Washington to Stephens Media Group.

In July 2019, it was announced that the company would acquire 37 stations from Mapleton Communications. This acquisition  was approved on October 9, 2019, and was completed on October 15, 2019.

Radio stations

Oklahoma

Tulsa, Oklahoma (Flagship) 
KTSO 100.9 Soft Oldies, better known as "100.9 KTSO" 
KXOJ-FM 94.1 Christian Adult Contemporary
KCFO 970 Christian Talk
KMYZ-FM 104.5 Alternative, better known as "Z104.5 The Edge"
KYAL-FM 97.1 Sports talk, better known as "Sports Animal"
KYAL 1550 Sports talk, better known as "Sports Animal ESPN Radio"

Ardmore, Oklahoma
KKAJ-FM 95.7 Country, better known as "Texoma Country"
KTRX 92.7 Contemporary hits, known as Star 92.7, Today's Best Music
KVSO 1240 Sports Talk, simulcast on 107.5 K298CR (Ardmore)
KYNZ 107.1Classic Hits, formerly known as "GTO 107"

New York

Massena, New York
WRCD 101.5 Classic Rock, better known as "The Fox"
WVLF 96.1 Adult Contemporary, better known as "The Mix"
WMSA 1340 News/Talk

Ogdensburg, New York
WNCQ-FM 102.9 Country, better known as "Q-Country"
WPAC 98.7 Oldies, better known as "PAC 98.7"
WYSX 96.7 CHR, better known as "Yes-FM"

Rochester, New York
WFKL 93.3 Adult Hits, better known as "The Fickle"
WRMM-FM 101.3 Adult Contemporary, better known as "Warm 101.3"
WZNE 94.1 Alternative, better known as "The Zone"

Watertown, New York
WCIZ-FM 93.3 Classic Hits, better known as "Z93"
WFRY-FM 97.5 Country, better known as "Froggy"
WNER 1410 Sports Talk, better known as "FOX Sports Radio"
WTNY 790  News/Talk

Louisiana

Alexandria, Louisiana
 KLAA-FM 103.5 Country, better known as "LA 103.5"
 KEZP 104.3 Christian Adult Contemporary, better known as "The Bridge"
 KBKK 105.5 Classic Country, better known as "K-Buck"
 KEDG 106.9 Adult contemporary, better known as "Sunny 106.9"

Monroe, Louisiana
 KMYY 92.3 Country, better known as "The Wolf"
 KNNW 103.1 CHR, better known as "Now FM"
 KXRR 106.1 Rock, better known as "Rock 106"
 KZRZ 98.3 Adult Contemporary, better known as "Sunny 98.3"

California

Chico, California
 KALF 95.7 Country, better known as "The Wolf"

Merced, California
 KUBB 96.3 Country, better known as "Cubb Country"
 KABX-FM 97.5 Adult Contemporary, better known as "K97.5"
 KLOQ-FM 98.7 Regional Mexican, better known as "Radio Lobo"
 KHTN 104.7 Rhythmic CHR, better known as "Hot 104.7"
 KYOS 1480	News/Talk
 KBRE 1660	Active Rock, better known as "105.7 The Bear". Simulcast on 105.7 K289CB (Los Banos)

Monterey-Salinas-Santa Cruz, California
 KCDU 101.7 CHR, better known as "The Beach"
 KPIG-FM 107.5 Americana, better known as "The Pig"
 KHIP 104.3 Classic Rock, better known as "The Hippo"
 KKHK 95.5	Adult Hits, better known as "Bob-FM"
 KWAV 96.9 Adult Contemporary, better known as "The Wave"

Redding, California
 KQMS 1670 News Talk 1670 Simulcast on 104.9 K285FE (Redding) & 105.7 K289BT (Anderson)
 KSHA 104.3 Adult Contemporary better known as "K-Shasta"  
 KWLZ 99.3 CHR, better known as "Wild 99-3" 
 KRRX 106.1 Active Rock better known as "106X" 
 KNRO 1400 Sports Talk better known as "Fox Sports" Simulcast on 103.9 K280GP (Redding)
 KRDG 105.3 Classic Hits

Oregon

Medford, Oregon
 KTMT 580 Sports Talk, better known as "The Game"
 KTMT-FM 93.7 Christian contemporary, better known as "Joy! 93.7"
 KBOY-FM 95.7 Classic Rock
 KCMX-FM 101.9 Adult Contemporary, better known as "Lite 102"
 KAKT 105.1 Country, better known as "The Wolf"

Washington

Spokane, Washington
 KBBD 103.9 Adult Hits, better known as "Bob-FM"
 KDRK-FM 93.7 Country, better known as "The Mountain"
 KEYF-FM 101.1 Classic Hits
 KGA 1510 Sports talk, Better known as "103.5 The Game", Simulcast on 103.5 K278CY (Spokane)
 KJRB 790 Classic Rock, better known as "94.1 The Bear", Simulcast on 94.1 K231CU (Spokane)
 KZBD 105.7 CHR, better known as "NOW-FM"

Tri-Cities, Washington
KUJ-FM 99.1 FM CHR, better known as "Power 99.1"
KIOK 94.9FM Country, better known as "The Wolf"
KEGX 106.5FM Classic Rock, better known as "The Eagle"
KKSR 95.7FM Classic Hits, better known as "Big 95-7"
KALE 960AM Adult Contemporary, better known a "106.1 More FM", Simulcast on 106.1 K291BS (Richland)
KJOX 1340AM sports talk, ESPN Radio

Yakima, Washington
KARY-FM 100.9 FM Classic Hits, better known as "Cherry FM"
KBBO  1390 AM is a sports talk station, better known as "The Fan", Simulcast on 104.5 K283BX (Wapato)
KHHK 99.7 FM Rhythmic-CHR, better known as "Hot 99.7"
KTCR 980 AM Oldies, better known as "Kruzn 106.9 KTCR", Simulcast on 106.9 K295BT (Wapato)
KRSE 105.7FM Classic Rock, better known as "The Hawk"
KXDD 104.1FM Country, better known as "KX-Double-D"

References

Radio broadcasting companies of the United States
Companies based in Tulsa, Oklahoma
2008 establishments in Oklahoma